St Michael's (CLG Naomh Mícheál) is a GAA club based in Creeslough/Dunfanaghy in County Donegal. Located in the north of the county, the club is affected by rural issues such as low population and emigration; despite this they play at the top level in the Donegal Senior Football Championship and opened a new clubhouse in 2010. The club colours are red and white.

The club plays at the Bridge in Dunfanaghy.

The club has a rivalry with Cloich Cheann Fhaola.

History
The club does not have much of a history. Perhaps the most interesting fact about it is that 2014 European Ryder Cup captain Paul McGinley used to play for them.

The club reached the final of 2004 All-Ireland Intermediate Club Football Championship. reached the final of the 2011 Donegal Senior Football Championship, only to lose to Glenswilly. This was their first final appearance at senior level.

They contributed six players to the Donegal county team that won the 2012 All-Ireland Senior Football Championship Final at Croke Park, including Colm McFadden who scored a goal in the final and ended the season as top scorer.

Notable players

 Martin McElhinney — 2012 All-Ireland SFC winner
 Colm McFadden — 2012 All-Ireland SFC winner and All-Ireland SFC top scorer
 Antoin McFadden — 2012 All-Ireland SFC winner
 Mark Anthony McGinley — Donegal goalkeeper 2015–19
 Brian McLaughlin
 Daniel McLaughlin — 2012 All-Ireland SFC winner
 Christy Toye —2012 All-Ireland SFC winner
 Peter Witherow — 2012 All-Ireland SFC winner

Managers

Honours
 Donegal Senior Football Championship runner-up: 2011
 All-Ireland Intermediate Club Football Championship runner-up: 2004
 Ulster Intermediate Club Football Championship: 2003
 Donegal Intermediate Football Championship: 2003
 Donegal Junior Football Championship: 1983, 1992

References

External links
 Official website

Gaelic football clubs in County Donegal
Gaelic games clubs in County Donegal